The Golden Lady is a British thriller film directed by José Ramón Larraz and starring Christina World, June Chadwick, Suzanne Danielle and Desmond Llewelyn. Filmed in 1978, it was released in 1979.

Plot
Julia Hemingway (Ina Skriver, credited as Christina World), a British female mercenary, is hired by wealthy businessman Charlie Whitlock in order to help him eliminate the competition on the purchase of some oil fields in Saudi Arabia.  Hemingway coordinates a team of 3 sexy women to go undercover to complete the task, but is unaware that Whitlock plans on double crossing her so he won't have to pay for her services.

Reception
Variety reviewed the film unfavourably: "Hard to see much appeal in this cheapie, which features Danish newcomer Christina World as a distaff James Bond, but which will leave audiences neither shaken nor stirred. Action is underpowered, while sex, ever-expected, is underexploited. Script by Joshua Sinclair gets enmeshed in a pretentious plot..."

Cast
 Ina Skriver (credited as Christina World) as Julia Hemingway
 June Chadwick as Lucy  
 Suzanne Danielle as Dahlia  
 Anika Pavel as Carol  
 Stephan Chase as Max Rowlands
 Desmond Llewelyn as Dixon
 Patrick Newell as Charlie Whitlock 
 Ava Cadell as Anita 
 Edward de Souza as Yorgo Praxis 
 Dave King as Dietmar Schuster 
 Richard Oldfield as Wayne Bentley 
 Nayef Rashed as Mabrook
 Terry Downes as Trainer
 Hot Gossip as themselves
 Blonde on Blonde appearing as themselves

Soundtrack
The music for the film was composed by Georges Garvarentz. The theme song to the film, "The Golden Lady", was performed by The Three Degrees, and was co-written by Garvarentz with lead vocalist Sheila Ferguson. It was released as a single and peaked at #56 on the UK Singles Chart in June 1979.

References

External links

1979 films
1970s thriller films
British thriller films
Hong Kong thriller films
Films directed by José Ramón Larraz
Girls with guns films
1970s English-language films
1970s British films